Akob Aghi khachkar is a khachkar located just northeast of the village of Hayravank along the southwest shores of Lake Sevan in the Gegharkunik Province of Armenia. It lies in front of the western wall of the Hayravank Monastery complex, on the pedestal; the upper left corner is broken. It is included in the state list of immovable monuments of history and culture of Armenia (5.59/1.1.3.5)։ The khachkar was created by Akob, a 16th-century Armenian sculptor, maker of khachkars and tombstones.

Location 

Khachkar is erected in the northeastern part of Hayravank village, in front of the western wall of the Hayravank monastic complex, on a pedestal, the upper left corner is broken.

Episcopal record 

Two lines of lithic inscriptions have been preserved on the facade and next to the altar.

... ՁԵՌԱՄԲ ԱԿՈԲ ԱԲԵՂԻՆ
ԹՎ :ՋՂ: (1541)

According to the record, the khachkar was built by Akob Kazmogh in 1541.

Sculptures 

Khachkar is rich in sculptures; it is possible that there was a sculpture of Adam's head in the central part of the lower sphere, which is characteristic of the style of Gegharkunik khachkar craftsmen.

See also 

 Hayravank Monastery

References

External links 

 Դիվան հայ վիմագրության, Պ. 4. page 81

Armenian culture
Armenian Apostolic Church
Armenian Apostolic monasteries
Monuments and memorials in Armenia
Buildings and structures in Gegharkunik Province